El Tor ( / ), also romanized as Al-Tur and At-Tur and known as Tur Sinai, formerly Raithu, is a small city and the capital of the South Sinai Governorate of Egypt. The name of the city comes from the Arabic term for the mountain where the prophet Moses received the Tablets of the Law from God; this mountain is designated Jabal Al Tor.

At-Tur itself appears to have been founded in the 13th century near the site of the ancient Raythou (medieval Raya). The El Tor strain of cholera was discovered there in 1905. It was a quarantine camp for Muslim pilgrims returning from Hajj (the Islamic pilgrimage to Mecca).

History

Monastery
The Raithu desert is situated around El Tor, between Saint Catherine and the Red Sea. It is part of the Archdiocese of Mount Sinai and Raithu of the Eastern Orthodox Patriarchate of Jerusalem. The "Martyrs of Raithu" were 43 anchorites (early Christian hermits) murdered by bedouins (desert dwellers) during the reign of Emperor Diocletian (284-305CE). Christian monks fleeing persecutions had been present since the 3rd century, and the Raithu monastery (or Rutho) was commissioned in the 6th century by Byzantine emperor Justinian. The latter was proposed as a UNESCO World Heritage site on November 1, 1994, in the Cultural category. Theodore of Raithu was champion of neo-Chalcedonism in the early 7th century.

Portuguese attack 
En route to Suez with the objective to seek and destroy the Ottoman fleet, a Portuguese Armada was sent in 1541 to Red Sea.

After several days sailing, the commander Estevão da Gama gives the order to direct a surprise attack. The troops were able to disembark and the defenders came out to the shore but were pushed to the city  not managing to close the city doors. The Portuguese as the city fell, were ready to loot, but two Priests came to the Commander, and appeal to him avoiding the destruction.  Several soldiers were armed Knights after a mass, and the armada stayed for a few days preparing to sail and attack Suez.

Modern Egypt
El Tor was captured by Israel during the Six-Day War of 1967. It was returned to Egypt, along with the rest of the Sinai Peninsula, following the 1979 Egypt–Israel peace treaty.

Climate 
Its climate is classified by Köppen-Geiger system as hot desert (BWh).

See also
 List of cities and towns in Egypt

References

External links
 Portuguese Sea Battles Volume III - From Brazil to Japan 1539 - 1579 - https://www.amazon.co.uk/Books-Saturnino-Monteiro/s?rh=n%3A266239%2Cp_27%3ASaturnino+Monteiro

Governorate capitals in Egypt
Populated places in South Sinai Governorate
Populated coastal places in Egypt